This is a list of seasons completed by the Kansas City Royals, a  professional baseball franchise based in Kansas City, Missouri. They formerly played in the American League West until the 1994 realignment, where they now compete in the American League Central Division.

The team was formed by pharmaceutical executive Ewing Kauffman as a result of the move of the Athletics to Oakland, and began play in 1969. They quickly became competitive, achieving a winning record in their third season with an 85–76 win–loss record. By 1976, the young team was becoming the dominant force in the American League West, winning 90 or more games in four consecutive seasons from 1975 to 1978.

Despite two lapses to below 80 wins in the 1980s, the Royals continued to be a strong force, reaching the 1980 World Series (before being defeated by the Philadelphia Phillies), and winning in 1985 against cross-state rivals the St. Louis Cardinals. During that postseason, they became the first team to ever rally from a three games to one deficit twice to win the World Series. The 2016 Chicago Cubs accomplished the same feat, by defeating the Cleveland Indians in a seven-game series.

The team remained competitive throughout the mid-1990s before entering a long period of failure. From 1995 through 2013, the team had only two winning seasons in 2003 and 2013. For 28 consecutive seasons, between the 1985 World Series championship and 2014, the Royals did not qualify to play in the Major League Baseball postseason, one of the longest postseason droughts during baseball's expanded wild-card era. The worst years during this era were from 2002 to 2006, when the Royals had four 100-loss seasons out of five.

The team broke its postseason drought by securing the franchise's first ever wild card berth in 2014. They advanced to the 2014 World Series, where they were defeated by the San Francisco Giants in seven games. The next season, the team would go 95–67, the best record in the American League, securing the franchise's first divisional title since 1985, and the first Central division title ever. The team would eventually advance to the 2015 World Series, where they defeated the New York Mets in five games.

Table Key

Regular season results

Record by decade 
The following table describes the Royals' MLB win–loss record by decade.

These statistics are from Baseball-Reference.com's Kansas City Royals History & Encyclopedia.

Postseason record by year 
The Royals have made the postseason nine times, with the first one being in the 1976 season and the most recent being in 2015.

References

External links
 Royals Year-By-Year Results at MLB.com
 Royals Postseason Results at MLB.com

 
Major League Baseball teams seasons
Seasons